Miserable may refer to:

 "Miserable" (song), a song by Lit
 Mr. Miserable, a fictional character in the children's book Mr. Happy by Roger Hargreaves
 Miserable, a performing name of American singer-songwriter Kristina Esfandiari (born 1988)
Misérable cake, a type of traditional Belgian cake

See also 
 Les Misérables (disambiguation)
 Los miserables (disambiguation)